The Red Lion is a Grade II listed pub at Ampney St Peter, Gloucestershire, GL7 5SL.

It is on the Campaign for Real Ale's National Inventory of Historic Pub Interiors.

It was built in the 18th century.

It is currently not open for trade.

References

Grade II listed pubs in Gloucestershire
National Inventory Pubs
Pubs in Gloucestershire